The Airport and Airway Trust Fund (AATF) provides funding for the federal commitment to the aviation system of the United States of America through several aviation-related excise taxes.  It was established on the books of the United States Department of the Treasury in 1971. The existence of an accumulated surplus in the fund has led some to question whether users of the aviation system are receiving their fair share of government spending given the aviation excise taxes they pay.

See also
Airport and Airway Development Act of 1970

References

1971 establishments in the United States
Aviation in the United States
United States Department of the Treasury